Kota State, also known as Kotah State, was a state in India, centered on the city of Kota, now located in Rajasthan State of the India.

History

The average revenue of Kota state in 1901 was Rs.31,00,000.

Rulers
The rulers of Kota were from the Hada sept of the Chauhan Rajput clan and bore the title of Maharao.

Maharaos
Apr 1696 – 18 June 1707: Ram Singh I: (b. 16.. – d. 1707) 
18 Jun 1707 –  8 September 1713: interregnum
 8 September 1713 – 19 June 1720: Bhim Singh I: (b. 1682 – d. 1720) 
19 Jun 1720 – Oct 1723: Arjun Singh: (d. 1723) 
Oct 1723 – 1 August 1756: Durjan Sal: (d. 1756) 
1756 – Mar 1757: Ajit Singh: (b. bf. 1676 – d. 1757) 
Mar 1757 – 17 December 1764: Chhatar Sal Singh I: (b. bf.1718 – d. 1764) 
17 Dec 1764 – 17 January 1771: Guman Singh: (b. 1724 – d. 1771) 
17 Jan 1771 – 19 November 1819: Umaid Singh I: (b. 1761 – d. 1819) 
19 Nov 1819 – 20 July 1828: Kishor Singh II: (b. c. 1781 – d. 1828) 
20 Jul 1828 – 27 March 1866: Ram Singh II: (b. 1808 – d. 1866) 
27 Mar 1866 – 11 June 1889: Shatru pal : (b. 1837 – d. 1889) 
11 Jun 1889 – 27 December 1940: Umed Singh II: (b. 1873 – d. 1940) (from 23 May 1900, Sir Umed Singh II)
11 Jun 1889 –  5 December 1896: .... – Regent
27 Dec 1940 – 18 April 1948: Bhim Singh II: (b. 1909 – d. 1991)

Titular Maharaos
On 18 April 1948, the Maharao merged his state with the union of India and the state thus ceased to have independent existence. The Maharao lost his ruling powers but continued to hold certain titles and privileges until 1971, when everything was withdrawn. Nevertheless, the Maharao remains the head of the erstwhile royal family and an important cultural figure in Kota. The non-ruling Maharaos are listed below:
18 April 1948 – 21 June 1991: Bhim Singh II: (b. 1909 – d. 1991); last ruling Maharao. 
21 June 1991 – 29 January 2022: Brijraj Singh
29 January 2022 - Present : Ijyaraj Singh
The heir apparent is Jaidev Singh, only son of Maharao Ijyaraj Singh

Maharao Bhim singh
In history, the day of 12 February is associated with the Father of the Nation, Mahatma Gandhi. On the same day in 1948, his ashes were flown to several holy ponds including the Ganges River in Allahabad, Chambal River Ghat in Kota, Rajasthan. 13 days before this, i.e. on January 30, 1948, Gandhiji was assassinated by Nathuram Godse. On the 13th day of his death, a kalash was reverentially flown on the banks of the Chambal river as a nation-wide expedition, in the presence of thousands of thousands of male women, the urns of Mahatma Gandhi were flown by aircraft by Kota Maharaj Shri Bhim Singh Ji During this time, thousands of people were present at the Ghat besides the former Maharao Bhim Singh of Kota. This inscription was installed by the then Home Minister Rajchandra Sena in memory of it, this inscription still remains on Rampura Chhoti Samaj which represents this historical site as a memorial. Is the place where immersion of Mahatma Gandhi's ashes was executed.

See also 
Hadoti
Political integration of India

References

External links

Princely states of India
Kota district
History of Kota, Rajasthan
1579 establishments in India
1948 disestablishments in India